Zach Line (born April 26, 1990) is a former American football fullback who played seven seasons in the National Football League (NFL). He was signed by the Minnesota Vikings as an undrafted free agent in 2013. He played college football at Southern Methodist University.

Early years
Line attended Oxford High School in Oxford, Michigan. As a senior, he had a team-high 154 tackles with eight forced fumbles and four recoveries from the inside linebacker spot; on offense, he rushed for 1,723 yards with 17 touchdowns while also throwing for three more scores. For his season efforts, he was named a first Team All-State pick.

Regarded as a two-star recruit by Rivals.com, Line committed to SMU on January 29, 2008. He also received a scholarship offer from Robert Morris University. Line has two brothers, Prescott and Ben, that played at Michigan State University and Robert Morris University, respectively.

College career
Line attended and played college football at SMU from 2009–2012. In the 2009 season, he finished with 49 carries for 189 rushing yards and seven rushing touchdowns. In the 2010 season, he finished with 244 carries for 1,494 rushing yards and ten rushing touchdowns. In the 2011 season, he finished with 208 carries for 1,224 rushing yards and 17 rushing touchdowns. In the 2012 season, his final collegiate season, he finished with 277 carries for 1,278 rushing yards and 13 rushing touchdowns.

Collegiate statistics

Professional career

Minnesota Vikings
On April 27, 2013, Line signed with the Minnesota Vikings as an undrafted free agent following the 2013 NFL Draft. In the Vikings' first preseason game against the Houston Texans, he scored on a 61-yard touchdown pass from quarterback Matt Cassel. In the season opener against the Detroit Lions, he had one reception for eight yards in his NFL debut. He appeared in two other games in the 2013 season. Line was released by the team on September 14, 2014, re-signed to the practice squad shortly after, then was promoted to the active roster on October 3. On September 20, 2015, Line scored the first touchdown of his career against the Detroit Lions. The next week, against the San Diego Chargers, Line scored another touchdown, the second of his career. Line also caught a pass from quarterback Teddy Bridgewater and took it 49 yards to set up a score in Minnesota's 28–19 victory over the Detroit Lions in Week 7. Overall, in the 2015 season, he finished with six carries for ten rushing yards and two rushing touchdowns to go along with six receptions for 95 receiving yards and one receiving touchdown. In the 2016 season, he finished with seven carries for 15 rushing yards in 15 games.

New Orleans Saints
On August 24, 2017, Line signed with the New Orleans Saints. He was released on September 2, 2017. He was re-signed on October 3, 2017. In 12 games, he finished with seven carries for 28 rushing yards to go along with two receptions for eight yards and a receiving touchdown. The Saints made the playoffs and faced off against the Carolina Panthers in the Wild Card Round. In the 31–26 victory, he had a one-yard rushing touchdown. Line and the Saints' season ended in the Divisional Round in a 29–24 loss to the Minnesota Vikings.

On April 5, 2018, Line re-signed with the Saints on a two-year contract. In Week 3 against the Atlanta Falcons, Line scored his first touchdown on the season. He finished the 2018 season with nine carries for 41 rushing yards to go along with five receptions for 14 receiving yards and two receiving touchdowns.

In the 2019 season, Line appeared in 12 games and recorded seven carries for 20 rushing yards to go along with six receptions for 36 receiving yards.

On January 15, 2020, Line announced his retirement from the NFL via Instagram after seven seasons at the age of 29.

Line scored 6 touchdowns in his NFL career, two rushing and four receiving. He rushed 36 times for 114 yards, and had 20 catches for 161 yards. Line was a core special teams player as well, returning five kickoffs for 59 yards and making seven special teams tackles over the span of his career.

Personal life
As of 2021, Line worked at his former high school, Oxford High School, as head football coach.

References

External links

SMU Mustangs bio

1990 births
Living people
American football fullbacks
Minnesota Vikings players
New Orleans Saints players
People from Oxford, Michigan
Players of American football from Michigan
SMU Mustangs football players